is a railway station in the city of Handa, Aichi Prefecture,  Japan, operated by Meitetsu.

Lines

Station layout
The station has two opposed side platforms connected by a footbridge. The station is staffed.

Platforms

Adjacent stations

Station history
The Chita Railway became part of the Meitetsu group on February 2, 1943. The station was renamed to its present name on December 1, 1949. A new station building was completed in June 1982. In July 2006, the Tranpass system of magnetic fare cards with automatic turnstiles was implemented.

Passenger statistics
In fiscal 2018, the station was used by an average of 3284 passengers daily (boarding passengers only).

Surrounding area
Handa High School
Handa Agricultural High School
Handa Technical High School

See also
 List of Railway Stations in Japan

References

External links

 Official web page

Railway stations in Japan opened in 1931
Railway stations in Aichi Prefecture
Stations of Nagoya Railroad
Handa, Aichi